"One Said to the Other" is a song by Australian punk rock band the Living End. It was released on 20 January 2003 as the first single from their third album, Modern ARTillery (2003). The song peaked at No. 19 on the Australian ARIA Singles Chart and was ranked No. 52 on Triple J's Hottest 100 for 2003.

Track listing
Australian CD single
 "One Said to the Other"
 "What Would You Do?"
 "Blinded"
 "Fond Farewell"

Charts

References

External links
 

2003 singles
2003 songs
EMI Records singles
The Living End songs
Songs written by Chris Cheney